Ying Yang Forever is the sixth studio album by Atlanta-based rap duo Ying Yang Twins. All of the tracks were produced by Joe Traxx.

Track listing

 "We Back Intro" - 0:29
 "Ying Yang Forever" - 4:55
 "Yall Ain't Ready" (featuring C-Moe) - 4:44
 "Centipede" (featuring Lil Jon) - 4:16
 "Top Model" - 3:50
 "Damn" - 3:36
 "Put It on Me" (featuring Korey B.) - 4:02
 "Dats My Folks (Skit)" - 0:41
 "Dats My Folks" - 4:34
 "Pop Da Trunk" - 2:55
 "Mad" (featuring Sydnee-Jane) - 3:29
 "I'm Still Hustlin' Intro" - 0:55
 "I'm Still Hustlin'" - 4:44
 "Whats Up" - 3:41
 "Weed & Dope" - 4:39
 "The Girl Is a Hoe" - 3:14
 "So Cold" (featuring C-Moe) - 4:22
 "Do It" - 4:01
 "Holla at a Bitch" - 3:17
 "Closet Freak" (featuring Korey B.) - 2:31
 "Get a Lil Low" (featuring Bizzy Bone) - 3:39
 "Earthquake" - 3:35
 "Fever" (Bonus Track) - 4:00

References

2009 albums
Ying Yang Twins albums